Swimming at the 1992 Summer Paralympics consisted of 163 events, 88 for men and 75 for women. Because of ties for third place in the women's 50 metre freestyle B3 and men's 50 metre freestyle B2 events, a total of 165 bronze medals were awarded.

Starting in 1992, there was a move away from Les Autres specific classifications to functional based classification systems at the Paralympic Games.  This was realized in swimming, where Les Autres sportspeople competed directly against people with other disabilities including cerebral palsy, spinal cord injuries and amputations.  As a result, the 1992 Games saw the total number of classes for people with physical disabilities drop from 31 to 10. Still, swimming, athletics and table tennis used a classification system for the Barcelona Games that was still mostly medical based.

This medal table includes also the 1992 Paralympic Games for Persons with mental handicap, which held by the same organizing committee, and is part of same event, but in Madrid, between 15 and 22 September in the same year.

Medal table

Participating nations

Medal summary

Men's events

Women's events

References 

 

1992 Summer Paralympics events
1992
Paralympics